The Bambi Molesters Play Out Of Tune is the debut EP disc of Croatian rock band The Bambi Molesters. This early recordings differentiate from the band's later ones. The record has cheap production and it sounds more like 60's garage punk than surf rock. The disc contents only 2 instrumentals and 9 songs with vocals, including a cover-version of Pere Ubu song.  It was recorded and released on cassette in 1995, while the Croatian War of Independence was still ongoing.

Track listing

Personnel
 Dalibor Pavičić - Vocals, guitar
 Dinko Tomljanović - Guitar
 Lada Furlan - Bass
 Hrvoje Zaborac - Drums

External links
 at Listen loudest!

1995 EPs
The Bambi Molesters albums